Operation Kingfisher was an operation planned to rescue Allied prisoners of war from Japanese captivity in Borneo towards the end of the Second World War. The operation did not come to fruition and almost 2,500 POWs died during the Sandakan Death Marches.

See also 
 Batu Lintang camp
 Berhala Island, Sandakan
 Borneo campaign, 1945
 1st Parachute Battalion (Australia)
 The March (1945)

References

Further reading 

 
 

Sandakan
British North Borneo
Military history of Malaysia
Kingfisher
Japanese prisoner of war and internment camps
Japanese war crimes
Forced marches
1945 in Japan
History of Sabah